Data mesh is a sociotechnical approach to building a decentralized data architecture by leveraging a domain-oriented, self-serve design (in a software development perspective), and borrows Eric Evans’ theory of domain-driven design and Manuel Pais’ and Matthew Skelton’s theory of team topologies. Data mesh mainly concerns itself with the data itself, taking the data lake and the pipelines as a secondary concern.  The main proposition is scaling analytical data by domain-oriented decentralization. With data mesh, the responsibility for analytical data is shifted from the central data team to the domain teams, supported by a data platform team that provides a domain-agnostic data platform.

History 
The term data mesh was first defined by Zhamak Dehghani in 2019 while she was working as a principal consultant at the technology company Thoughtworks. Dehghani introduced the term in 2019 and then provided greater detail on its principles and logical architecture throughout 2020. The process was predicted to be a “big contender” for companies in 2022. Data meshes have been implemented by companies such as Zalando, Netflix, Intuit, VistaPrint, JPMorgan Chase, PayPal and others.

In 2022, Dehghani left Thoughtworks to found NextData Technologies to focus on decentralized data.

Principles 
Data mesh is based on four core principles:

 Domain ownership
 Data as a product'''
 Self-serve data platform
 Federated computational governance

In addition to these principles, Dehghani writes that the data products created by each domain team should be discoverable, addressable, trustworthy, possess self-describing semantics and syntax, be interoperable, secure, and governed by global standards and access controls. In other words, the data should be treated as a product that is ready to use and reliable.

See also 
 Data management
 Data platform
 Data vault modeling, method of data modeling with storage of data from various operational systems and tracing of data origin, facilitating auditing, loading speeds and resilience
 Data warehouse, a well established type of database system for organizing data in a thematic way
 ETL and ELT

References 

Databases